Reverse Breathing is a breathing technique associated with qigong. It is commonly referred to as Taoist Breathing. It consists of expanding the abdomen while breathing out through the nose and then compressing it while inhaling through the mouth, which is the opposite of what an abdomen would do during natural, instinctive breathing.

Uses 
The technique is also widely practiced in a number of martial arts. Some notable ones include Chinese systems such as Baguazhang, T'ai chi ch'uan and other styles of Kung Fu. Reverse Breathing is believed to activate healing and protective Chi as the practitioner is consciously controlling the breath in a way opposite to normal breathing. By expanding the abdomen while delivering some technique (e.g. punch), the martial artists also protect the inner organs from any received counterattack.

Effects and benefits 
There are many benefits to the practice of reverse breathing. The Livestrong article says that it is believed to help strengthen abdominal muscles because the practice requires that one uses their abdominal muscles in order to take in breath while shrinking their stomach. It is also believed to strengthen one's immune system by spreading oxygen throughout the body that creates an energy that can protect the body from viruses and negative bacteria. This Idea is known as Guardian Chi. According to the book, The Tao of Natural Breathing, reverse breathing can also improve energy levels by causing a change in pressure between the chest and the abdomen. It is also believed to increase one's lung capacity. Breathing in reverse to how the body naturally would, allows more air to enter one's lungs, which can help to train the lungs to take in more air. Reverse breathing is also often practiced for the purpose of deepening a meditation or drawing energy into the body.

References

Taoist practices
Qigong
Mind–body interventions
Respiration